Faama Mademba Sy was a king of Sansanding, in what is today Mali.

The French colonial administration placed him as 'chief' of Massina after its conquest in the 1890s, in fact in the new kingdom of Sansanding at south-west. In 1899 he was famously brought before a French military court on charges that he abused his authority, but he kept political support until his death.

References
Roberts, Richard, “The Case of Faama Mademba Sy and the Ambiguities of Legal Jurisdiction in Early Colonial French Soudan,” in Kristin Mann and Richard Roberts, eds., Law in Colonial Africa (Portsmouth, NH: Heinneman, 1991), 1pp. 85–205.

References

History of Mali
People of French West Africa
19th-century monarchs in Africa
African kings